Rosenblattichthys nemotoi  is a species of fish found in the Eastern Indian Ocean that belongs to Rosenblattichthys, a genus of pearleyes.

Size

Etymology
The fish is named in honor of Takahisa Nemoto (1930-1990), of the Ocean Research Institute, University of Tokyo, for his great contributions to the biology of the Antarctic, including his direction of the cruise during which the type specimen was collected.

References 

Aulopiformes
Taxa named by Muneo Okiyama
Taxa named by Robert Karl Johnson
Fish described in 1986
Fish of the Indian Ocean